Bryan Demore is a Canadian filmmaker. He is most noted as a producer of the film Riceboy Sleeps, which he was a Canadian Screen Award nominee for Best Motion Picture at the 11th Canadian Screen Awards in 2023.

The co-founder of A Lasting Dose Productions, he previously adapted a short film Just Living, based off Patrick Lane’s original poem, which he  also was co-director and writer on. He produced Anthony Shim’s debut feature film Daughter.

References

External links

Film directors from British Columbia
Film producers from British Columbia
Living people
Canadian film production company founders